Route 12 or Highway 12 can refer to:

For a list of roads named A12, see A12 roads.

International
 Asian Highway 12
 European route E12 
 European route E012

Argentina
 National Route 12

Australia

NSW 
 Western Sydney Airport Motorway (proposed)

NT 
 Plenty Highway

VIC/SA 
 Mallee Highway
 South Gippsland Highway

Austria
 Inntal Autobahn

Bulgaria
 Републикански път I-12

Canada
 Alberta Highway 12
 British Columbia Highway 12
 Manitoba Highway 12
 Nova Scotia Trunk 12
 Ontario Highway 12
 Prince Edward Island Route 12
 Quebec Route 12 (former)
 Saskatchewan Highway 12

China
  G12 Expressway

Czech Republic
 I/12 Highway; Czech: Silnice I/12

Dominican Republic
 DR-12

India
  National Highway 12 (India)

Iran
 Road 12

Iraq
 Highway 12 (Iraq)

Ireland
 N12 road (Ireland)

Israel
 Highway 12 (Israel)

Italy
 Autostrada A12
 RA 12
 State road 12

Japan
 Japan National Route 12

Korea, South
 Expressway 12
 Muan–Gwangju Expressway
 Gwangju–Daegu Expressway

Malaysia
 Tun Razak Highway

New Zealand
 New Zealand State Highway 12

Paraguay
 National Route 12

Poland 
  Motorway A12 (former; 1986–2000/2001)
  Expressway S12
  National road 12

Romania
DN12 - Drumul Național 12
A12 - Pitești–Craiova Expressway

South Africa
 N12 road (South Africa)

Taiwan
 Provincial Highway 12 (Taiwan)

United Kingdom
 British A12 (London-Great Yarmouth)
 Northern Irish M12 (Craigavon)
 A12 road (Northern Ireland)

United States
 Interstate 12
 U.S. Route 12
 New England Interstate Route 12 (former)
 Alabama State Route 12 (former)
 Arkansas Highway 12
 California State Route 12
 County Route A12 (California)
 County Route E12 (California)
 County Route G12 (California)
 County Route J12 (California)
 County Route S12 (California)
 Colorado State Highway 12
 Connecticut Route 12
 Delaware Route 12
 Florida State Road 12
 County Road 12 (Gadsden County, Florida)
 County Road 12 (Leon County, Florida)
 Georgia State Route 12
 Illinois Route 12 (former)
 Iowa Highway 12
 County Route C12 (Humboldt County, Iowa)
 K-12 (Kansas highway) (former)
 Kentucky Route 12
 Louisiana Highway 12
 Louisiana State Route 12 (former)
 Maryland Route 12
 Massachusetts Route 12
 M-12 (Michigan highway) (former)
 Mississippi Highway 12
 Missouri Route 12
 Nebraska Highway 12
 Nevada State Route 12 (former)
 New Hampshire Route 12
 New Jersey Route 12
 County Route 12 (Monmouth County, New Jersey)
 New Mexico State Road 12
 New York State Route 12
 County Route 12 (Allegany County, New York)
 County Route 12 (Cattaraugus County, New York)
 County Route 12 (Chemung County, New York)
 County Route 12 (Chenango County, New York)
 County Route 12 (Clinton County, New York)
 County Route 12 (Genesee County, New York)
 County Route 12 (Greene County, New York)
 County Route 12 (Jefferson County, New York)
 County Route 12 (Nassau County, New York)
 County Route 12 (Niagara County, New York)
 County Route 12 (Onondaga County, New York)
 County Route 12 (Otsego County, New York)
 County Route 12 (Putnam County, New York)
 County Route 12 (Schuyler County, New York)
 County Route 12 (St. Lawrence County, New York)
 County Route 12 (Steuben County, New York)
 County Route 12 (Suffolk County, New York)
 County Route 12 (Ulster County, New York)
 County Route 12 (Warren County, New York)
 North Carolina Highway 12
 Ohio State Route 12
 Pennsylvania Route 12
 Rhode Island Route 12
 South Carolina Highway 12
 South Dakota Highway 12 (former)
 Tennessee State Route 12
 Texas State Highway 12
 Texas State Highway Loop 12
 Ranch to Market Road 12
 Texas Park Road 12
 Utah State Route 12
 Vermont Route 12
 State Route 12 (Virginia 1918-1933) (former)
 State Route 12 (Virginia 1933-1935) (former)
 State Route 12 (Virginia 1935-1953) (former)
 State Road 12 (Washington 1905–1919) (former)
 Washington State Route 12 (1964-1967) (former)
 Primary State Highway 12 (Washington) (former)
 Secondary State Highway 12G (Washington) (former)
 Secondary State Highway 12H (Washington) (former)
 West Virginia Route 12
 Wisconsin Highway 12 (former)
 Wyoming Highway 12

Territories
 Guam Highway 12
 Puerto Rico Highway 12

Uruguay
  Route 12 Dr. Luis Alberto de Herrera

See also
 List of A12 roads
 List of highways numbered 12A
 List of highways numbered 12B
 List of highways numbered 12C
 List of highways numbered 12D
 List of highways numbered 12E
 List of highways numbered 12F